Vitali G. Korionov (Виталий Корионов) was a Deputy Chief of the Communist Party of the Soviet Union Central Committee's Americas Department and a political commentator for Pravda.

See also
Communism

References

Year of birth missing
Year of death missing
Soviet politicians